Highway 99 is a provincial highway in the Canadian province of Saskatchewan. It runs from Highway 20 near Craven to Highway 6 near Fairy Hill.

According to MapArt, Highway 99 is entirely unpaved. The highway follows the course of the Qu'Appelle River, starting at Highway 20 and 641 in Craven, passing Craven Dam at the west end and ending up at Highway 6 on the east end.

Major intersections
From west to east:

See also
Roads in Saskatchewan
Transportation in Saskatchewan

References

099